František Čermák and Leoš Friedl were the defending champions, but did not participate this year.

Julian Knowle and Jürgen Melzer won the title, defeating Michael Kohlmann and Alexander Waske 6–3, 6–4 in the final.

Seeds

  Julian Knowle /  Jürgen Melzer (champions)
  Martín García /  Sebastián Prieto (quarterfinals)
  Ashley Fisher /  Jordan Kerr (first round)
  Stephen Huss /  Tripp Phillips (quarterfinals)

Draw

External links
2006 Grand Prix Hassan II Doubles Draw

Doubles
Grand Prix Hassan II